Louden Swain is an American indie rock band from Los Angeles that was formed in 1997. The members consist of lead singer and guitarist Rob Benedict, guitarist Billy Moran, bassist Michael Borja, and drummer Stephen Norton. The band was named after the main character in the film Vision Quest.

The band acts as the house band, and performs concerts on Saturday nights, for the Supernatural conventions that are held throughout the year in the United States and Canada. Louden Swain has released nine albums, the first being Able-Legged Heroes in 2001, followed by Overachiever, Suit and Tie, A Brand New Hurt, Eskimo, and Sky Alive. Their seventh album, entitled No Time Like the Present, was released on January 13, 2017, and their eighth album, and first live album, Saturday Night Special in August 2017. Their ninth album Splitting the Seams was released in October 2018. During 2021, due to the COVID-19 pandemic, their album process was delayed and the band released several singles. The band then released two albums in 2022, their tenth album Foolish released in April and their eleventh, and latest, album Feelings and Such in November.

Discography
 Able-Legged Heroes (2001)
 Overachiever (2003)
 Suit and Tie (2006)
 A Brand New Hurt (2009)
 Eskimo (2011)
 Sky Alive (2014)
 No Time Like the Present (2017)
 Saturday Night Special (live) (2017)
 Splitting the Seams (2018)
 Foolish (2021)
 Feelings and Such (2022)

Singles 
Singles not released as part of a main album

 Telephone Tree (2004) - as part of This One's for the Fellows Compilation 
 Help You (2011) - as part of A Little Help Soundtrack

 Here Come the Snakes (2018 Remix) (2019)
 Hard Time Come Again No More (feat. Jericho) (2023) - as part of The Winchesters Soundtrack

References

Indie pop groups from Los Angeles
Supernatural (American TV series)
musicians
Musical groups established in 1997
1997 establishments in California